The eighteenth season of Dancing with the Stars, also known as Dancing with the Stars: All Stars, premiered on 11 April 2021.

Following the conclusion of the seventeenth season, it was announced that the show would not return for another season on Network 10. However, in December 2020, Seven announced that the channel had regained the rights to the series, and would be bringing the show back with an All-Stars edition in 2021. For the first time in the show's history, the series was pre-recorded instead of live and was filmed at the ICC in Sydney in March 2021. The series also aired nightly instead of weekly.

Daryl Somers and Sonia Kruger, who hosted the show from its inception in 2004, until 2007 and 2011 respectively, replaced Grant Denyer and Amanda Keller as hosts. Meanwhile, original judges Todd McKenney, Helen Richey, Mark Wilson and Paul Mercurio replaced Craig Revel Horwood, Sharna Burgess and Tristan MacManus on the judging panel.

Couples
The line-up was announced on 16 March 2021, consisting of ten former contestants, including five former winners, as well as four wildcard contestants who hadn't previously competed in the show.

Previous seasons

Scoring chart

 indicate the lowest score for each night
 indicate the highest score for each night
 the couple was eliminated that night
 the couple earned immunity, and could not be eliminated
 the returning couple in the bottom two/three
 the winning couple
 the runner-up couple
 the third-place couple

Averages

Highest and lowest scoring performances
The best and worst performances in each dance according to the judges' 40-point scale are as follows:

Couples' highest and lowest scoring dances

According to the traditional 40-point scale:

Nightly scores
Unless indicated otherwise, individual judges scores in the charts below (given in parentheses) are listed in this order from left to right: Todd McKenney, Helen Richey, Paul Mercurio, Mark Wilson.

Night 1: First Dances

Running order

Night 2: First Dances

A three-way tie occurred between Erin & Julian, Jamie & Siobhan, and Jessica & Lyu. The judges first saved Jessica & Lyu. The judges then chose to save Jamie & Siobhan based on their judges' scores, eliminating Erin & Julian.

Running order

Night 3

Running order

 Judges' votes to save
 Wilson: Matty J & Ruby
 Mercurio: Matty J & Ruby
 Richey: Matty J & Ruby
 McKenney: Did not vote, but would have voted to save Schapelle & Shae

Night 4

Running order

 Judges' votes to save
 Wilson: Jamie & Siobhan
 Mercurio: Jamie & Siobhan
 Richey: Jamie & Siobhan
 McKenney:  Vote not revealed

Night 5

Running order

Lindy Hop marathon dance-off
In the Lindy Hop marathon dance-off, the couples danced together. The couples were awarded points depending on when they were voted out by the judges. The first voted out won six points while the winner received ten points, with couples placing indicating the number of points added to their score.

 Judges' votes to save
 Wilson: Kyly & Gustavo
 Mercurio: Kyly & Gustavo
 Richey: Kyly & Gustavo
 McKenney:  Did not vote, but would have voted to save Matty J & Ruby

Night 6

Running order

Disco marathon dance-off
In the disco marathon dance-off, the couples danced together. The couples were awarded points depending on when they were voted out by the judges. The first voted out won six points while the winner received ten points, with couples placing indicating the number of points added to their score.

 Judges' votes to save
 Wilson: Manu & Katrina
 Mercurio: Jamie & Siobhan
 Richey: Renee & Jarryd
 McKenney:  Manu & Katrina

Night 7: The Winner Announced

Running order

Dance chart
The celebrities and professional partners danced one of these routines for each corresponding night:
 Night 1: Cha-cha-cha, Foxtrot, Jive, Quickstep, Tango, or Viennese Waltz
 Night 2: Cha-cha-cha, Foxtrot, Tango, or Viennese Waltz
 Night 3: One unlearned dance (introducing Charleston)
 Night 4: One unlearned dance (introducing Rumba and Salsa)
 Night 5: One unlearned dance (introducing Contemporary and Samba) and Lindy Hop Marathon
 Night 6: One unlearned dance (introducing Argentine tango, Paso Doble, and Waltz) and Disco Marathon
 Night 7: Freestyle

 Highest scoring dance
 Lowest scoring dance
 Not performed or scored
 Won Immunity challenge
 Won Dance Off
 Lost Dance Off

Ratings
 Colour key:
  – Highest rating episode and night during the series
  – Lowest rating episode and night during the series

References

Season 18
2021 Australian television seasons
Television series impacted by the COVID-19 pandemic